
The NBA G League (previously known as the National Basketball Development League (NBDL) from 2001 to 2005 and the National Basketball Association Development League (NBA D-League) from 2005 to 2017) Finals is the championship game or series for the NBA G League and the conclusion of the league's postseason.

Since the league's inception in 2001–02, a variety of formats has been used to determine the champion. From the inaugural postseason in 2002 through 2006, the four teams with the best records advanced to the postseason because there were no division or conference splits to divide the eight teams. The first two seasons, both semi-finals and the Finals series were in a best-of-three format, whereby a team must win two of the three games to advance or win the championship. Then, between 2004 and 2007, the playoffs used a single-elimination tournament among the four teams, with two semi-final games and one winner-takes-all championship match.

In 2007, the league had expanded to 12 teams and was divided into Eastern and Western Conferences, comprising six teams apiece. The playoffs pitted each conference's winner against one another, with the Eastern Conference's Dakota Wizards winning the championship 129–121 in overtime against the Colorado 14ers. The best-of-three format returned in 2008. With the league's continued expansion to 14 teams in 2008 and 16 teams in 2009, the two-conference format was replaced with a three-division format consisting of Western, Southwestern and Central Divisions. Both the 2008 and 2009 NBADL championship series were between teams representing the Western and Southwestern Divisions, with no Central teams making it to the finals. Since 2010, the league has re-formatted to the Eastern and Western Conferences. Due to there being two more teams in the Western Conference (nine) than the Eastern Conference (seven), and because the top eight teams with the best regular season records qualified for the postseason irrespective of conference, the 2010 and 2012 NBADL Finals consisted of two Western Conference teams. The 2021 edition was a one-game match, which equaled the amount of games played for the other playoff rounds; it returned to the best-of-three format in 2022.

Key

Champions

Results by teams

See also 
 List of NBA champions

Notes 
 The Asheville Altitude relocated and became the Tulsa 66ers in 2005–06.
 The Columbus Riverdragons relocated and became the Austin Toros in 2005–06.
 The Colorado 14ers went on hiatus in 2009–10 and returned as the Texas Legends in 2010–11 after a relocation.
 The Huntsville Flight relocated and became the Albuquerque Thunderbirds in 2005–06, then the franchise renamed itself to the New Mexico Thunderbirds in 2010–11. The franchise was then purchased and relocated in 2011–12 and became known as the Canton Charge and then the Cleveland Charge in 2021–22.
 After two years as the North Charleston Lowgators, the franchise became known as the Charleston Lowgators for one season prior to their relocation. The franchise was known as the Florida Flame for the 2004 through 2006 seasons.
 The Dakota Wizards relocated and became the Santa Cruz Warriors in 2012–13.

References 

Champions
National Basketball Association lists